Club Municipal Sportif d'Oissel is a French sports club founded in 1968. The club is based in Oissel, Seine-Maritime and have teams for basketball, handball and association football. As of the 2020–21 season, their football team plays in the Championnat National 3. Their home stadium is the Stade Marcel Billard in the town, which has a capacity of 4,000 spectators. A number of notable footballers have played for the club, including Matthieu Louis-Jean and Grégory Tafforeau.

Current squad
As of 16 October 2018.

References

External links
  

Oissel
Oissel
1968 establishments in France
Sport in Seine-Maritime
Association football clubs established in 1968
Football clubs in Normandy